Campeol is an Italian surname. Notable people with the surname include:

 Ado Campeol (1928–2021), Italian restaurateur
 Axel Campeol (born 2000), Italian football player

Italian-language surnames